Drobonso is a community and the district capital of the Sekyere Afram Plains District, a district in the Ashanti Region of Ghana.

Institutions 

 Miro Forestry Limited, a factory which deals in the manufacturing of veneer and plywood.
 Kumawuman Rural Bank
 Drobonso Health Service
 Drobonso Police Station
 Community Day School

References 

Ashanti Region
Communities in Ghana